Kevin McGarry is an American football coach.  He has been an assistant coach at San Diego State University since 2011. 
McGarry served as the head football coach at the University of San Diego from 1996 to 2003, compiling a record of 39–37.

McGarry played college football at Saddleback College from 1974 to 1975 and the University of San Diego from 1976 to 1977. He joined San Diego's coaching staff the following year and served as an assistant coach for 18 years from 1978 to 1995. McGarry was fired from his post at San Diego after seven games during the 2003 season.

Head coaching record

Notes

References

External links
 San Diego State profile

1950 births
Living people
American football defensive backs
American football wide receivers
Saddleback Gauchos football players
San Diego Toreros football players
San Diego Toreros football coaches
San Diego State Aztecs football coaches